The men's big air competition in snowboarding at the 2022 Winter Olympics was held on 14 February (qualification) and 15 February (final), at the Big Air Shougang in Beijing. Su Yiming of China won the event, his first Olympic gold medal. Mons Røisland of Norway won silver, his first Olympic medal, and Max Parrot of Canada won bronze.

The defending champion was Sébastien Toutant. He was competing but did not make it to the final. Neither the 2018 silver medalist, Kyle Mack, nor the bronze medalist, Billy Morgan, qualified for the Olympics. At the 2021–22 FIS Snowboard World Cup, only two big air events were held before the Olympics, won by Jonas Bösiger and Su Yiming. Mark McMorris was also the 2021 world champion, with Parrot and Marcus Kleveland being the silver and bronze medalists, respectively. Kleveland was 2019 X-Games winner, ahead of Sven Thorgren and Røisland.

Qualification

A total of 30 snowboarders qualified to compete at the games. For an athlete to compete they must have a minimum of 50.00 FIS points in Big Air or Slopestyle on the FIS Points List on January 17, 2022, and a top 30 finish in a World Cup event in Big Air or slopestyle or at the FIS Snowboard World Championships 2021. A country could enter a maximum of four athletes into the event.

Results

Qualification

 Q — Qualified for the Final

The top 12 athletes in the qualifiers advanced to the Final.

Final

References

Men's snowboarding at the 2022 Winter Olympics